La Briosa (Spanish for The Verve One) is the ring name of a semi-retired Mexican luchadora, or female professional wrestler who was primarily active from the mid-1970s until 2000. She is a second-generation wrestler, daughter of Sugi Sito, and together with her husband, a wrestler known under the names El Mexicano and Halcón 78. Together they have three sons that have followed in their footsteps and also become wrestlers, known as Halcón 78 Jr., Hammer Fist and Combat. La Briosa is the cousin of wrestlers Pánico, El Jabato, and Black Cat, and the aunt of Skándalo and Stigma. She has only worked a small number of matches since 2000.

During her career, La Briosa won the Mexican National Women's Championship on one occasion, and was the only wrestler to win the Mexican National Women's Tag Team Championship twice, first with Vicky Carranza and later on with Neftali. She worked as an enmascarada, or masked wrestler for most of her career, but lost it to Martha Villalobos 1992. La Briosa formed a trios team with Neftali, and La Monstra known as Las Nasty Girls.

Championships and accomplishments
Empresa Mexicana de Lucha Libre'
Mexican National Women's Championship (1 time)
Mexican National Women's Tag Team Championship (2 times)  with Vicky Carranza and Neftali

Luchas de Apuestas record

References

1959 births
Living people
Mexican female professional wrestlers
Mexican National Women's Champions
Mexican National Women's Tag Team Champions